You Are Not My Mother is a 2021 Irish psychological horror film written and directed by Kate Dolan. The film stars Hazel Doupe as Char, a young woman at odds with her grandmother Rita (Ingrid Craigie) after her mother Angela (Carolyn Bracken) briefly goes missing, only to return soon afterward with a radically changed personality.

The film premiered in the Midnight Madness stream at the 2021 Toronto International Film Festival, where it was named first runner up for the People's Choice Award: Midnight Madness.

Plot 
An opening flashback scene shows Rita Delaney taking her infant granddaughter Charlotte (“Char”) into the woods, while the baby’s mother Angela protests. In the wood, Rita sits the baby on the ground and lights a ring of fire around her. She watches as the baby screams.

In the present day, the teenage Char lives with her mother and grandmother; her uncle Aaron lives nearby and visits occasionally. The household is somewhat dysfunctional; Rita is in poor health, Angela is depressed and spends much of her time in bed, and there is no food in the house. Char attends a girls’ Catholic high school. Although academically gifted, she does not fit in with the other students, who consider her their social inferior, and she is subjected to bullying. One morning, driving Char to school, Angela tells her daughter that "she can't do this anymore". Her car is later found abandoned, with no sign of Angela. The family report the disappearance to the police, but they are not able to offer much help. However Angela returns within a few days, strangely altered. Her depression is gone, and she is cheerful, dressing up and cooking dinner for the family. Rita seems suspicious of these changes in Angela and deliberately upsets the pan of soup that Angela had prepared, so the family are obliged to eat the chips that Aaron has brought over instead.  But Angela appears to have little appetite and sits staring sullenly at her mother.

Char witnesses several instances of increasingly bizarre behaviour in the "new" Angela and becomes frightened. Her uncle Aaron is poisoned by Angela, which leads to him being hospitalised. In the meantime Char is forging a friendship with one of her former bullies, Suzanne. Char confides in Suzanne about the changes in Angela; Suzanne in turn tells Char how her own mother died when she was very young. One evening Rita tells Char the story of her past; when Char was a baby, Rita realised she had been swapped with a “changeling”. The only way to get the real Char back was to place her near fire, hence the fiery ring ritual in the woods.  This worked, but Char sustained a small burn to her cheek. Her family told her the resultant scar was a birthmark.

Rita tells Char that the "new" Angela is also a changeling, and thus the fire ritual must be repeated to get the real Angela back. Although Char appears to agree, when she sees Angela bound and gagged and tied to a bed she is appalled. Despite her grandmother’s protests, Char frees Angela, only to realise too late that Rita spoke the truth, and that this is not the "real" Angela. The changeling kills Rita. Char runs out of the house, but is waylaid by the school bullies, who force her inside an unlit Halloween bonfire. However the bullies are scared off by the approach of the changeling Angela. Angela pushes her way into the bonfire to get to Char, but Char sets the structure alight. Angela burns while Char is rescued from the flames by Suzanne. In the final scene, Angela is restored to her true self, and Char makes her a lucky token from twigs "to keep her safe", as her grandmother had once made for her. Mother and daughter are happy to be together again, ready to move forward with their lives.

Cast
 Hazel Doupe as Charlotte "Char" Delaney
 Lucie Doran as young Char
 Carolyn Bracken as Angela Delaney
 Paul Reid as Aaron Delaney
 Jade Jordan as Ms. Devlin
 Ingrid Craigie as Rita Delaney
 Jordanne Jones as Suzanne O'Conner
 Katie White as Kelly
 Aoife Spratt as Officer Jenny
 Martin O'Sullivan as Frank
 Miriam Devitt as TV sitcom - Witch
 Florence Adebambo as Amanda
 Colin Peppard as Jamie
 Madi O'Carroll as Tour Guide

Reception

References

External links
 

2021 films
2021 horror films
2020s psychological horror films
Irish horror films
English-language Irish films
2020s English-language films